Edward Joseph Riches (10 March 1907 – 4 September 1994) was an Australian rules footballer who played with Geelong in the Victorian Football League (VFL).

Riches later served in the Australian Army during World War II.

Notes

External links 

1907 births
1994 deaths
Australian rules footballers from Victoria (Australia)
Geelong Football Club players